CDOT may refer to:
\cdot – the LaTeX input for the dot operator (⋅)
Cdot, a rapper from Sumter, South Carolina
Centre for Development of Telematics, India
Chicago Department of Transportation
Clustered Data ONTAP, an operating system from NetApp
Colorado Department of Transportation
Connecticut Department of Transportation
British Crown Dependencies and Overseas Territories
Ċ – a letter of the Latin alphabet